Scarborough Shoal, also known as Bajo de Masinloc ("under Masinloc" in Spanish), Panatag Shoal, Huangyan Island (Mandarin ), and Democracy Reef, are two rocks in a shoal located between Luzon and Macclesfield Bank administrated by China in the South China Sea.

It is a disputed territory claimed by the Republic of the Philippines through the 1734 Velarde map, while the People's Republic of China and the Republic of China (Taiwan) claim it through the disputed nine-dash line (originally an eleven-dash line which included waters in the Gulf of Tonkin). The shoal's status is often discussed in conjunction with other territorial disputes in the South China Sea such as those involving the Spratly Islands, and the 2012 Scarborough Shoal standoff. It was administered by the Philippines as part of its Zambales province, until 2012, when a standoff was initiated by China through the use of warships against fishing boats, resulting in effective capture by the Chinese maritime forces.

In 2013, the Philippines solely filed an international case against China in the arbitration court in The Hague, Netherlands. In 2016, the court declared that China's so-called nine-dash line claim in the entire South China Sea was invalid, while upholding the sovereign rights of the Philippines in the area. China rejected the court's decision, sending more warships in Scarborough Shoal and the Spratly Islands, while a multitude of nations backed the Tribunal's ruling including the claimants to the area such as Malaysia, the Philippines, and Vietnam.

The shoal was named by Captain Philip D'Auvergne, whose East India Company East Indiaman Scarborough grounded on one of the rocks on 12 September 1784, before sailing on to China, although it already had a Spanish name recorded in the 1734 Velarde map of Spanish Philippines.

Geography 
Several other coral rocks encircle the lagoon, forming a large atoll.

The nearest point of land is in Palauig, Zambales on Luzon island in the Philippines,  due east.

History 

Scarborough Shoal is named after a British merchant ship, the 'Scarborough' which was wrecked on the feature on 12 September 1748. A number of countries have made historic claims of the use of Scarborough Shoal. China has stated that a 1279 Yuan dynasty map and subsequent surveys by the royal astronomer Guo Shoujing carried out during Kublai Khan's reign established that Scarborough Shoal were used since the thirteenth century by Chinese fishermen. No such 1279 map has been released by China to the public. In an article from 18 February 1980, the Beijing Review stated that Guo Shoujing built an observatory in the Paracel Islands, not Scarborough Shoal. Given that Guo's observatories were huge constructions, it is unlikely that either story is true.

During the Spanish period of the Philippines, a 1734 map was made, which named Scarborough Shoals as Panacot, a feature under complete sovereignty of Spanish Philippines. The shoal's current name was chosen by Captain Philip D'Auvergne, whose East India Company East Indiaman Scarborough briefly grounded on one of the rocks on 12 September 1784, before sailing on to China. As early as 1937 to 1938, the Commonwealth of the Philippines laid claim to Scarborough Shoal. The Philippine government conducted an oceanographic survey in 1957, and in 1965, the Philippine flag was raised in the area.

When China built their facilities on Mischief Reef within the Philippine EEZ in 1995, then National Security Advisor Jose T. Almonte pushed for the establishment of a lighthouse on Scarborough Shoal to bolster the Philippine claim. The parts of the lighthouse had been fabricated on the mainland Philippines but, according to Almontre, the project was scuttled for internal political reasons and to avoid antagonizing the Chinese.

The 2012 Scarborough Shoal standoff between China and the Philippines led to a situation where access to the shoal was restricted by the People's Republic of China. The expected intervention of the United States to protect its ally through an existing mutual defence treaty did not commence after the United States indirectly stated that it does not recognise any nation's sovereignty over Scarborough Shoal, leading to strained ties between the Philippines and the United States. In January 2013, the Philippines formally initiated arbitration proceedings against China's claim on the territories within the "nine-dash line" that includes Spratly Islands and Scarborough Shoal, which it said is "unlawful" under the United Nations Convention on the Law of the Sea (UNCLOS). An arbitration tribunal was constituted under Annex VII of UNCLOS and it was decided in July 2013 that the Permanent Court of Arbitration (PCA) would function as registry and provide administrative duties in the proceedings.

On 12 July 2016, the arbitrators of the tribunal of PCA ruled in favor of the Philippines on most of her submissions.. They concluded in the decision that there was no evidence that China had historically exercised exclusive control over the waters or resources, hence there was "no legal basis for China to claim historic rights" over the nine-dash line. Accordingly, the PCA tribunal decision is ruled as final and non-appealable by either country. The tribunal also criticised China's land reclamation projects and its construction of artificial islands in the Spratly Islands, saying that it had caused "severe harm to the coral reef environment". It also characterised Taiping Island and other features of the Spratly Islands as "rocks" under UNCLOS, and therefore are not entitled to a 200 nautical mile exclusive economic zone. China however rejected the ruling, calling it "ill-founded". In 2019, Taiwan also rejected the ruling.

In late 2016, following meetings between the Philippine president Duterte and his PRC counterparts, the PRC "verbally" allowed Filipino fishermen to access the shoals for fishing, sparking criticism as "allowing" would mean China is implying that it owns the territory. In January 2018, it was revealed that for every 3,000 pesos' worth of fish catch by Filipino fisherfolk, China took them in exchange for "two bottles of mineral water" worth 20 pesos.  On 14 June 2018, China's destruction of Scarborough Shoal's reefs surged to an extent which they became visible via satellites, as confirmed by the University of the Philippines Diliman.

Land reclamation and other activities in the surrounding area 
A March 2016 article by the CSIS Asia Maritime transparency Initiative said that satellite imagery had shown no signs of any land reclamation, dredging or construction activities in Scarborough shoal and the only vessels present were a Chinese civilian ship anchored within the mouth of the lagoon, which has been typical for several years, and two Filipino trimaran-type fishing ships outside the shoal. However, according to the then U.S. chief of naval operations Admiral John Richardson that did not mean that Chinese ships had not performed surveys in preparation for reclamation.

In September 2016 during the ASEAN summit, the Philippine government produced photos that it said showed fresh PRC construction activity at the shoal. A US administration official questioned the Philippines' claim, saying the United States had not detected any unusual activity at Scarborough Shoal.

Also in September 2016, the New York Times reported that PRC activities at the Shoal continued in the form of naval patrols and hydrographic surveys.

In March 2017 the mayor of Sansha City said China was to begin preparatory work for an environmental monitoring station on Scarborough Shoal.

PRC activities in and around the Scarborough Shoal have drawn criticism from US officials. In March 2017 U.S. Senators Marco Rubio and Ben Cardin introduced the South China Sea and East China Sea Sanctions Act which would impose sanctions for Chinese entities and people helping to build South and East China Sea projects.

In June 2019 the Philippine Coast Guard spotted a Chinese People's Liberation Army Navy warship, alongside two China Coast Guard vessels, and two Chinese maritime militia vessels near the shoal.

In September 2019, Antonio Carpio, a former Chief Justice of the Supreme Court of the Philippines, said that China would try to reclaim the Scarborough shoal within Philippine President Rodrigo Duterte's term before it signs the Asean-China Code of Conduct because Duterte had said that Beijing could not be stopped from building because it was too powerful.

Academic Jay Batongbacal said that the visiting forces agreement between the Philippines and the United States deterred the transformation of Scarborough Shoal by the PRC  into an artificial island, saying, "Scarborough Shoal is the only piece left in the puzzle that they're trying to build. They can now completely exclude other countries from the South China Sea militarily if they're able to put into place all of these military bases."

Sovereignty dispute

Claims by China and Taiwan

The People's Republic of China and Taiwan (Republic of China) claim that Chinese people discovered the shoal centuries ago and that there is a long history of Chinese fishing activity in the area. The shoal lies within the nine-dash line drawn by China on maps marking its claim to islands and relevant waters consistent with United Nations Convention on the Law of the Sea (UNCLOS) within the South China Sea. An article published in May 2012 in the PLA Daily states that Chinese astronomer Guo Shoujing went to the island in 1279, under the Yuan dynasty, as part of an empire-wide survey called "Measurement of the Four Seas" (四海測驗). No such 13th century map has been made public by China and no evidence on the existence of the map is known. In 1979 historical geographer Han Zhenhua (韩振华) was among the first scholars to claim that the point called "Nanhai" (literally, "South Sea") in that astronomical survey referred to Scarborough Shoal. In 1980 during a conflict with Vietnam for sovereignty over the Paracel Islands (Xisha Islands), however, the Chinese government issued an official document claiming that "Nanhai" in the 1279 survey was located in the Paracels. Historical geographer Niu Zhongxun defended this view in several articles. In 1990, a historian called Zeng Zhaoxuan (曾昭璇) argued instead that the Nanhai measuring point was located in Central Vietnam. Historian of astronomy Chen Meidong (陈美东) and historian of Chinese science Nathan Sivin have since agreed with Zeng's position in their respective books about Guo Shoujing. a 2019 article in the publication Maritime Issues suggested that a common fishing ground for China, Vietnam and the Philippines as the best option to avoid deterioration of the conflict.

In 1935, China, as the Republic of China (ROC), regarded the shoal as part of the Zhongsha Islands. That position has since been maintained by both the ROC, which now governs Taiwan, and the People's Republic of China (PRC). In 1947 the shoal was given the name Minzhu Jiao. In 1983 the People's Republic of China renamed it Huangyan Island with Minzhu Jiao reserved as a second name. In 1956 Beijing protested Philippine remarks that the South China Sea islands in close proximity to Philippine territory should belong to the Philippines. China's Declaration on the territorial Sea, promulgated in 1958, says in part,

China reaffirmed its claim of sovereignty over the Zhongsha Islands in its 1992 Law on the territorial Sea and the Contiguous Zone. China claims all the islands, reefs, and shoals within a U-shaped line in the South China Sea drawn in 1947 as its territory. Scarborough shoal lies within this area.

China further asserted its claim shortly after the departure of the US Navy force from Subic, Zambales, Philippines. In the late 1970s, many scientific expedition activities organised by State Bureau of Surveying, National Earthquake Bureau and National Bureau of Oceanography were held in the shoal and around this area. In 1980, a stone marker reading "South China Sea Scientific Expedition" was installed on the South Rock, but was removed by the Philippines in 1997.

Claim by the Philippines 

The Philippines state that its assertion of sovereignty over the shoal is based on the juridical criteria established by public international law on the lawful methods for the acquisition of sovereignty. Among the criteria (effective occupation, cession, prescription, conquest, and accretion), the Philippine Department of Foreign Affairs (DFA) has asserted that the country exercised both effective occupation and effective jurisdiction over the shoal, which it terms Bajo de Masinloc, since its independence. Thus, it claims to have erected flags in some islands and a lighthouse which it reported to the International Maritime Organization. It also asserts that the Philippine and US Naval Forces have used it as impact range and that its Department of Environment and Natural Resources has conducted scientific, topographic and marine studies in the shoal, while Filipino fishermen regularly use it as fishing ground and have always considered it their own.

The DFA also claims that the name Bajo de Masinloc (translated as "Masinloc shoal") itself identifies the shoal as a particular political subdivision of the Philippine Province of Zambales, known as Masinloc. As basis, the Philippines cites the Island of Palmas Case, where the sovereignty of the island was adjudged by the international court in favour of the Netherlands because of its effective jurisdiction and control over the island despite the historic claim of Spain. Thus, the Philippines argues that the historic claim of China over the Scarborough Shoal still needs to be substantiated by a historic title, since a claim by itself is not among the internationally recognised legal basis for acquiring sovereignty over territory.

It also asserts that there is no indication that the international community has acquiesced to China's historical claim, and that the activity of fishing of private Chinese individuals, claimed to be a traditional exercise among these waters, does not constitute a sovereign act of the Chinese state.

The Philippine government argues that since the legal basis of its claim is based on the international law on acquisition of sovereignty, the exclusive economic zone claim on the waters around Scarborough is different from the sovereignty exercised by the Philippines in the shoal.

The Philippine government has proposed taking the dispute to the International Tribunal for the Law of the Sea (ITLOS) as provided in Part XV of the United Nations Convention on the Law of the Sea, but the Chinese government has rejected this, insisting on bilateral discussions.

The Philippines also claims that as early as the Spanish colonisation of the Philippines, Filipino fishermen were already using the area as a traditional fishing ground and shelter during bad weather.

Several official Philippine maps published by Spain and United States in 18th and 20th centuries show Scarborough Shoal as Philippine territory. The 18th-century map "Carta hydrographica y chorographica de las Islas Filipinas" (1734) shows the Scarborough Shoal then was named as Panacot Shoal. The map also shows the shape of the shoal as consistent with the current maps available as today. In 1792, another map drawn by the Malaspina expedition and published in 1808 in Madrid, Spain also showed Bajo de Masinloc as part of Philippine territory. The map showed the route of the Malaspina expedition to and around the shoal. It was reproduced in the Atlas of the 1939 Philippine Census, which was published in Manila a year later and predates the controversial 1947 Chinese South China Sea Claim Map that shows no Chinese name on it. Another topographic map drawn in 1820 shows the shoal, named there as "Bajo Scarburo", as a constituent part of Sambalez (Zambales province). During the 1900s, Mapa General, Islas Filipinas, Observatorio de Manila, and US Coast and Geodetic Survey Map include the Scarborough Shoal named as "Baju De Masinloc". A map published in 1978 by the Philippine National Mapping and Resource Information Authority, however, did not indicate Scarborough Shoal as part of the Philippines. Scholar Li Xiao Cong stated in his published paper that Panacot Shoal is not Scarborough Shoal, in the 1778 map "A chart of the China Sea and Philippine Islands with the Archipelagos of Felicia and Soloo", Scarborough shoal and 3 other shoals Galit, Panacot and Lumbay were all shown independently. Li also pointed out that the three shoals were also shown on Chinese maps which were published in 1717.

In 1957, the Philippine government conducted an oceanographic survey of the area and together with the US Navy force based in then U.S. Naval Base Subic Bay in Zambales, used the area as an impact range for defence purposes. An 8.3-meter high flag pole flying a Philippine flag was raised in 1965.  An iron tower that was to serve as a small lighthouse was also built and operated the same year.  In 1992, the Philippine Navy rehabilitated the lighthouse and reported it to the International Maritime Organization for publication in the List of Lights.  , the military-maintained lighthouse is non-operational.

Historically, the Philippine boundary has been defined by its 3 treaties, Treaty of Paris (1898), Treaty of Washington (1900) and "Convention regarding the boundary between the Philippine Archipelago and the State of North Borneo". Many analysts consider that the 1900 Treaty of Washington concerned only the islands of Sibutu and Cagayan de Sulu., but a point of view argued that Scarborough Shoal has been transferred to the United States based on the Treaty of Washington (1900), ignoring the fact that the cession documents from the United States to the Philippines did not have any reference to the Scarborough Shoal.

The DFA asserts that the basis of Philippine sovereignty and jurisdiction over the rock features of Bajo de Masinloc are not premised on the cession by Spain of the Philippine archipelago to the United States under the Treaty of Paris, and argues that the matter that the rock features of Bajo de Masinloc are not included or within the limits of the Treaty of Paris as alleged by China is therefore immaterial and of no consequence.

The Philippines' bilateral dispute with China over the shoal began on 30April 1997 when Filipino naval ships prevented Chinese boats from approaching the shoal. On 5 June of that year, Domingo Siazon, who was then the Philippine Secretary of Foreign Affairs, testified in front of the Committee on Foreign Relations of the United States Senate that the Shoal was "a new issue on overlapping claims between the Philippines and China".

In 2009, the Philippine Baselines Law of 2009 (RA 9522), principally authored by Antonio Trillanes and sponsored by Senator Miriam Defensor Santiago, was enacted into law. The new law classified the Kalayaan Island Group and the Scarborough Shoal as a regime of islands under the Republic of the Philippines.

Permanent Court of Arbitration tribunal ruling

In January 2013, the Philippines formally initiated arbitration proceedings against the PRC claim on the territories within the "nine-dash line" that include Scarborough Shoal, which the Philippines claimed is unlawful under the UNCLOS convention. An arbitration tribunal was constituted under Annex VII of UNCLOS. It was decided in July 2013 that the Permanent Court of Arbitration (PCA) would function as registry and provide administrative duties in the proceedings.

On 12 July 2016, the PCA tribunal ruled in favor of the Philippines on most of her submissions. In its decision, it concluded that there is no evidence that China had historically exercised exclusive control over the waters or resources, hence there was "no legal basis for China to claim historic rights" over the area within the nine-dash line. The tribunal also judged that the PRC had caused "severe harm to the coral reef environment", and that it had violated the Philippines' sovereign rights in its Exclusive Economic Zone by interfering with Philippine fishing and petroleum exploration by, for example, restricting the traditional fishing rights of Filipino fishermen at Scarborough Shoal. The PRC rejected the ruling, calling it "ill-founded"". Chinese Communist Party general secretary Xi Jinping insisted that "China's territorial sovereignty and marine rights in the South China Sea will not be affected by the so-called Philippines South China Sea ruling in any way". Xi added that nevertheless, the PRC would still be "committed to resolving disputes" with its neighbours. Afterwards, China sent more warships to the Scarborough Shoal. Numerous countries called on the international community to support the Tribunal ruling and positively acknowledge it. Among them were Australia, Belgium, Bosnia and Herzegovina, Bulgaria, Canada, Croatia, Cyprus, Czechia, Denmark, Estonia, Finland, France, Germany, Greece, Hungary, India, Ireland, Italy, Japan, Latvia, Lithuania, Luxembourg, Malta, Myanmar, the Netherlands, New Zealand, Poland, Portugal, Romania, Singapore, Slovakia, Slovenia, South Korea, Spain, Sweden, the United Kingdom, and the United States, as well as claimants to the area such as Malaysia, the Philippines, and Vietnam.

See also 

 China–Philippines relations
 List of territorial disputes
 South China Sea Islands
 West Philippine Sea

Other East Asian island disputes 
Kuril Islands dispute
Liancourt Rocks dispute
Okinotorishima, another smaller shoal with three skerries
Paracel Islands
Pratas Island 
Senkaku Islands dispute
Spratly Islands dispute

Notes

References

Further reading 

 
 
 
 
 Bonnet, Francois-Xavier "Geopolitics of Scarborough Shoal" Irasec's Discussion Papers, No 14, November 2012, Irasec.com 
 
 
 Hayton, B. (2014). The South China Sea: The Struggle for Power in Asia. Yale University Press. Retrieved 7 August 2018.

Territorial disputes of the Philippines
Disputed reefs
Islands of the South China Sea
Territorial disputes of China
Territorial disputes of the Republic of China
Landforms of Zambales
Zhongsha Islands
Reefs of the South China Sea
Reefs of the Philippines